Morten Høglund (born 16 July 1965 in Ski, Norway) is a Norwegian politician representing the Progress Party. He is currently a representative of Akershus in the Storting and was first elected in 2001. Høglund was the vice-mayor of Ski between 1989 and 1991, and then held the same position in Asker from 1995 to 2003.

Storting committees
2001–2009 member of the Foreign Affairs committee.
2005–2009 reserve member of the Electoral committee.
2001–2005 member of the Extended Foreign Affairs committee.

References

 Fremskrittspartiet - Biography

1965 births
Living people
Progress Party (Norway) politicians
Members of the Storting
21st-century Norwegian politicians
People from Ski, Norway